The Ombrone (Latin: Umbro) is a  long river in Tuscany, central Italy.

The Ombrone's source is at San Gusmè, near Castelnuovo Berardenga, on the south-eastern side of the Monti del Chianti. After a twisting route, it receives the waters of the tributaries Arbia, Merse and Orcia before reaching the plain near Istia d'Ombrone.

It subsequently passes near the city of Grosseto, before flowing into the Tyrrhenian Sea.

See also
Ombrone (département).

References

External links
Ombrone river: Finding the source by turismo.intoscana.it.

Rivers of the Province of Grosseto
Rivers of the Province of Siena
Drainage basins of the Tyrrhenian Sea
Rivers of Italy